The former Elks Lodge (B.P.O. E. #54) is a historic building in Lima, Ohio, United States.  The lodge was the fifty-fourth of the Benevolent and Protective Order of Elks to be chartered; it is the largest lodge in Ohio.  It is located within the Ohio West Central District No. 7120.  The original lodge building, built in 1909, has been sold and is, as of 2019, used by Tabernacle Baptist Church.

The lodge building was added to the National Register of Historic Places on October 7, 1982.  It was one of seventeen Lima buildings listed on the Register as a group, the "Lima Multiple Resource Area."  Of these buildings, it was one of the newest.  Around the time of its construction in the early twentieth century, oil and railroading had taken Lima's economy to an extremely prosperous point.

See also
Elks Lodge
List of Elks buildings

References

External links
Homepage
Alternative homepage
Elks Lodges Directory

Churches completed in 1909
Baptist churches in Ohio
Buildings and structures in Lima, Ohio
Prairie School architecture in Ohio
Elks buildings
Clubhouses on the National Register of Historic Places in Ohio
Properties of religious function on the National Register of Historic Places in Ohio
National Register of Historic Places in Allen County, Ohio